Thietmar may refer to:

 Thietmar, Count of Merseburg (died 932)
 Thietmar, Margrave of Meissen (died 979)
 Thietmar of Prague (died 982), bishop
 Thietmar of Merseburg (975–1018), bishop and chronicler
 Thietmar, Margrave of the Saxon Ostmark (died 1030)
 Thietmar of Minden, bishop (died 1206)
 Thietmar (pilgrim), visited the Holy Land in 1217–1218

See also
Dietmar (disambiguation)